Michael Dennis Abbott is a New Hampshire politician.

Education
Abbott graduated from Longmeadow High School. Abbott earned a B.A. from Brown University in 1970 and a M.E.d. from Keene State College in 1986.

Career
Abbott worked as principal of Hinsdale High School in New Hampshire from 1985 to 2000. On November 4, 2014, Abbott was elected to the New Hampshire House of Representatives where he represents the Cheshire 1 district. Abbott assumed office on December 3, 2014. Abbott is a Democrat.

Personal life
Abbott resides in Hinsdale, New Hampshire and has since 1970. Abbott is married to Sharon and has one child.

References

Living people
Brown University alumni
Keene State College alumni
American academic administrators
People from Hinsdale, New Hampshire
Democratic Party members of the New Hampshire House of Representatives
21st-century American politicians
Year of birth missing (living people)